Alexandre Abeid (born 23 September 1949) is a Brazilian volleyball player. He competed in the 1972 and 1976 Summer Olympics.

References

1949 births
Living people
Volleyball players at the 1972 Summer Olympics
Volleyball players at the 1976 Summer Olympics
Brazilian men's volleyball players
Olympic volleyball players of Brazil
Volleyball players from Rio de Janeiro (city)
Pan American Games medalists in volleyball
Pan American Games bronze medalists for Brazil
Medalists at the 1971 Pan American Games
21st-century Brazilian people
20th-century Brazilian people